Vinceroy Nelson (born 10 January 1996) is a Saint Kitts and Nevis international footballer who plays as a forward for St. Paul's United FC of the Saint Kitts Premier Division.

References

External links 
 
 
 Kean Cougars bio

1996 births
Living people
Association football forwards
Saint Kitts and Nevis footballers
Saint Kitts and Nevis international footballers
Saint Kitts and Nevis under-20 international footballers
Saint Kitts and Nevis youth international footballers
Cayon Rockets players
Kean Cougars men's soccer players
Atlantic City FC players
St. Paul's United FC players
National Premier Soccer League players
Saint Kitts and Nevis expatriate footballers
Saint Kitts and Nevis expatriate sportspeople in the United States
Expatriate soccer players in the United States